Gore and Perversion is the first album by death metal band Desecration, released in its original version on Anoxic Records in 1995. The album was seized and incinerated by the Gwent Constabulary due to the album's offensive content and what was deemed to be its obscene nature, and it was banned. The ensuing court case and media furore established the name Desecration in the South Wales scene and beyond.

The album was subsequently re-recorded in 2001 and re-released in 2003 as Gore and PerVersion 2. It was re-pressed as a white disc edition. The first fifty copies were signed and numbered by Ollie Jones and Michael Hourihan and were only available from the band.

The band was told to tone down the lyrics or forget about the music business. This did not happen however, and after three years of fine-tuning their style, Desecration recorded the album Murder in Mind.

Track listing
"Raping The Corpse"
"Human Gore"
"Penile Dissection"
"It Can't Be My Grave"
"Dead Bitch In The Skip"
"No More Room In The Freezer"
"Mutilated Genitalia"
"Immense Suffering"
"To Kill With A Drill"
"Pharaonic Circumcision"
"Coprophilliac Connoisseur"
"Fontanelle Fornication"
"I.A.I"  * Censored Title

Originally by :-

Paul Arlett

Ollie Jones

Glenn Thomas

Jason Jad Davies

References

External links

1995 albums
Desecration (band) albums
Obscenity controversies in music